The Kantō Massacre was a mass murder which the Japanese military, police and vigilantes committed against the Korean residents of the Kantō region, as well as socialists, communists, anarchists, and other dissidents, in the immediate aftermath of the 1923 Great Kantō earthquake. The massacre of Korean residents in particular is also known as the Massacre of Koreans in 1923.

The massacre occurred over a period of three weeks starting on September 1, 1923, the day on which a powerful earthquake struck the Kantō region. During this period, soldiers of the Imperial Japanese Army, police and vigilantes murdered an estimated 6,000 ethnic Koreans and Japanese socialists. The massacre was denied by Japanese authorities almost immediately after it occurred, while it was celebrated by certain elements in the public. It continues to be alternately denied and celebrated by Japanese right-wing groups today.

Timeline

September 1: Korean labor union offers food relief
Korean laborers in Yokohama had joined a stevedore union led by the Japanese organizer Yamaguchi Seiken. Yamaguchi was a left-wing organizer and at the May Day rally in 1920, some of his union members had shouted anti-colonial slogans; Japanese police responded with arrests and abuse. On September 1, 1923, immediately after the earthquake, Yamaguchi organized his union to provide food and water to the neighborhood, including commandeering supplies from ruined buildings. Police regarded the labor union as a "nest of socialists" and were likely unsettled by the well-organized food relief program.

September 1–2: Police spread false rumors and give permission to kill
Kanagawa Prefectural Police chief Nishizaka Katsuto reported that on the night of September 1 he gave his district chiefs "a certain mission to deal with the emergency situation," the details of which he refused to describe. Towards the end of his life, Nishizaka told an interviewer that "someone must have said that 'Korean malcontents' were dangerous in such a time of confusion."

According to multiple reports from Japanese witnesses, beginning on the night of September 2 police officers in Yokohama, Kanagawa and Tokyo began informing residents that it was permissible to kill Koreans. Some orders were conditional, such as killing Koreans who resist arrest, but others were more direct: "kill any Koreans who enter the neighborhood" or "kill any Koreans you find." Also on the night of September 2, as police organized a vigilante band to kill Koreans in the Noge region of Yokohama, one of the organizing police officers told a newspaper reporter that Koreans had been caught with a list of neighborhoods to burn, carrying gasoline and poison for wells. In the town of Yokosuka, police officers told locals that Korean men were raping Japanese women, inciting Japanese men to form vigilante lynch mobs. In Bunkyō, the police falsely reported that Koreans had poisoned the water and food supply. Nishizaka's final report on the massacre acknowledges in a secret appendix that these rumors were all false.

September 2–9: Japanese lynch mobs massacre Koreans and others 
As a result of the police-initiated rumors, beginning on September 2 Japanese citizens organized themselves into vigilante bands and accosted strangers on the street. Those who were believed to be Korean or Chinese were murdered on the spot. Vigilantes armed themselves with bamboo spears, clubs, Japanese swords, and guns. People who wore Korean or Chinese clothes were immediately killed, along with members of minority groups such as Ryukyuans whose languages were difficult for other Japanese people and foreigners to understand. 

On the morning of September 3, the Home Ministry issued a message to police stations around the capital encouraging the spread of rumors and violence, stating that “there are a group of people who want to take advantage of disasters. Be careful because Koreans are planning terrorism and robbery by arson and bombs." 

Koreans, Chinese, and Ryukyuans wore Japanese clothing in order to hide their identities. They also tried to properly pronounce shibboleths such as "十五円五十銭" (15 yen and 50 sen), with difficult elongated vowels. Those who failed these tests were killed. During that time, not only Koreans but also Chinese, Ryukyuans, and foreigners were all marked as Koreans. Some journalists who came to Tokyo were mistaken for Koreans and killed due to differences in their pronunciations. The vigilantes were indiscriminate with regards to gender and age. When the massacre reached its peak, the rivers Sumidagawa and Arakawa which flowed through Tokyo were stained with blood.

The filmmaker Akira Kurosawa, who was a child at the time, was astonished to witness the irrational behavior of the mob.
With my own eyes I saw a mob of adults with contorted faces rushing like an avalanche in confusion, yelling, “This way!” “No, that way!” They were chasing a bearded man, thinking someone with so much facial hair could not be Japanese....Simply because my father had a full beard, he was surrounded by a mob carrying clubs. My heart pounded as I looked at my brother, who was with him. My brother was smiling sarcastically....

Some Koreans sought safety in police stations in order to escape the slaughter, but in some areas vigilantes broke into police stations and pulled them out. In other cases, police officers handed groups of Koreans over to local vigilantes, who proceeded to kill them. The arrival of foreigners and other people in Tokyo meant death. The police continued to assist the killings or responded to reports of murder passively. In contrast, the Yakuza, who accepted Koreans among their membership, protected Koreans from the lynch mobs. 

Both vigilantes and Japanese Army troops burned Korean bodies in order to destroy the evidence of murder. Official Japanese reports in September claimed that only five Koreans had been killed, and even years after, the number of acknowledged deaths remained in the low hundreds. After the massacre, Korean survivors painstakingly documented the extent of the massacre. Based on their testimonies, Japanese eyewitness accounts, and additional academic research, current estimates of the death toll range from 6,000 to 9,000. Between 50 to 90 percent of the Korean population of Yokohama was killed.

September 3–16: Police and army assassinate left-wing leaders 

Amidst the mob violence, regional police and the Imperial Army used the pretext of civil unrest to liquidate political dissidents.

In a particularly egregious instance known as the Amakasu Incident, the married couple Sakae Ōsugi (Japan's first Esperanto teacher) and Noe Itō, both anarchists and feminists, were executed by Imperial Army officer Masahiko Amakasu along with their six-year-old nephew. The bodies of the parents and child were thrown in a well. The incident created national outrage and Amakasu was sentenced to ten years in prison, but he served only three.

September 18–November: Show trials and unpaid labor
Beginning on September 18, the Japanese government arrested 735 participants in the massacre. However, the government had no intent of sentencing the participants as they would murderers. In November, the Tokyo Nichi Nichi Shimbun reported that during the trials, the defendants and the judges were both smiling and laughing as they recounted the lynchings. The prosecution recommended light sentences.

As knowledge of the lynch mobs spread through the Korean community, thousands attempted to flee the city. The Tokyo police tasked a collaborationist group called Sōaikai with arresting escaping Koreans and detaining them in camps in Honjo, Tokyo. Tokyo police chief Maruyama Tsurukichi ordered the Sōaikai to confine Koreans to the camps to prevent them from spreading news of the massacre abroad. The Sōaikai eventually ordered 4,000 Koreans to perform unpaid labor cleaning up the city ruins for over two months.

Aftermath 
On September 5, after Prime Minister Uchida Kōsai acknowledged that unlawful killings had occurred, Tokyo officials met secretly to discuss a way to deny and minimize the massacre. Laying out their plans in a memorandum, they agreed to minimize the number of dead, blame the rumors of Korean violence on the labor organizer Yamaguchi Seiken, and frame innocent Koreans by accusing them of rioting. This plan was executed in the following months. A ban on reporting the death count was obeyed by all newspapers, while officials claimed only five people had died. On October 21, almost two months after the massacre began, local police arrested 23 Koreans, simultaneously lifting the ban so that the initial reporting on the full scale of the massacre was mixed with the false arrests.

Yamaguchi was publicly blamed by Japanese officials for starting the rumors of Korean mobs, but this logically incoherent charge was never formalized. After being held in prison for several months he was finally prosecuted only for redistributing food and water from ruined houses to earthquake survivors without permission of the homeowners. In July 1924 he was sentenced to two years in prison; it is unknown if he survived his imprisonment.

Korean newspapers in Seoul were blocked from receiving information about the massacre by local police. Two Koreans who personally escaped Tokyo and rushed to Seoul to report the news were arrested for "spreading false information" and the news report about them was completely censored. When word of the massacre did reach the Korean peninsula, Japan attempted to placate the Koreans by distributing films throughout the country showing Koreans being well treated. These films were reportedly poorly received. The Governor-General of Korea paid out 200 yen in compensation to 832 families of massacre victims, although the Japanese government on the mainland only admitted to about 250 deaths. The Governor-General also published and distributed propaganda leaflets with "beautiful stories" (bidan 美談) of Japanese protecting Koreans from lynch mobs. Police chief Nishizaka himself distributed bidan stories of heroic police protecting Koreans, which he later admitted in an interview were carefully selected to omit unflattering aspects.

Japanese whitewashing and denialism
After the massacre, Navy Minister Takarabe Takeshi praised the Japanese lynch mobs for their "martial spirit," describing them as a successful result of military conscription. Paper plays called kamishibai were performed for children which portrayed the slaughter with vivid, bloody illustrations. Performers would encourage children to cheer for the lynch mobs as they killed "dangerous" Koreans. In 1927, an official history of Yokohama City claimed that the rumors of Korean attackers had "some basis in fact." In 1996, historian J. Michael Allen remarked that the massacre is "hardly known outside Korea."

The issue has been rekindled in modern times. Miyoko Kudō's 2009 book The Great Kanto Earthquake: The Truth About the "Massacre of Koreans" (関東大震災「朝鮮人虐殺」の真実) was influential in inspiring grassroots-level attempts to whitewash the issue in official and public commemorations. Books denying the massacre and repeating the government frame story of 1923 became constant bestsellers in the 2010s. In April 2017, the Cabinet Office deleted historical evidence and acknowledgement of the massacre from their website. Beginning 2017, Tokyo mayor Yuriko Koike broke decades of precedent by refusing to acknowledge the massacre or offer condolences to the descendants of survivors, saying that whether a massacre occurred is a matter of historical debate. In July 2020, Koike was re-elected as mayor of Tokyo in a landslide victory. In September 2020 a Japanese group held a rally in Sumida, Tokyo calling for a memorial to the massacre located in Yokoamichō Park to be demolished, saying that the massacre never happened and the memorial constituted "hate speech against our ancestors."

Literary and artistic portrayals
Prewar narratives by Koreans frequently appealed to a Japanese readership to heal the wounds which were caused by ethnic divides, while in the immediate postwar period the "emperor system" was blamed for brainwashing massacre participants to act against their better instincts. After the 1970s such appeals to people's higher consciences faded away, and the massacre became part of a marker of indelible difference between the Japanese and Korean peoples and the Japanese people's willful ignorance of the massacre. Ri Kaisei's 1975 novel Exile and Freedom exemplifies this turning point with a central monologue: "Can you guarantee that it won't happen again right here and now? Even if you did, would your guarantees make Korean nightmares go away? No chance..." 

As the massacre passed out of living memory in the 1990s, it became hidden history to younger generations of Zainichi Koreans. In the 2015 novel Green and Red (Midori to aka 『緑と赤』), by Zainichi novelist  (深沢潮 Fukazawa Ushio), the Zainichi protagonist learns about the massacre by reading about it in a history book, which serves to give excess weight to her fears over anti-Korean sentiment. Fukazawa emphasizes that the narrator is driven to discover this history out of anxiety rather than having any preexisting historical understanding.

Director Oh Chongkong (吳充功, 오충공) made two documentary films about the pogrom: Hidden Scars: The Massacre of Koreans from the Arakawa River Bank to Shitamachi in Tokyo (Kakusareta tsumeato: Tokyo aragawa dote shūhen kara Shitamachi no gyakusatsu 隠された爪跡: 東京荒川土手周辺から下町の虐殺, 1983) and The Disposed-of Koreans: The Great Kanto Earthquake and Camp Narashino (Harasagareta Chōsenjin: Kantō Daishinsai to Narashino shūyōjo 払い下げられた朝鮮人: 関東大震災と習志野収容所, 1986).

There have been several plays about the massacre. The playwright and Esperantist Ujaku Akita wrote Gaikotsu no buchō (骸骨の舞跳) in 1924, decrying the culture of silence by Japanese; its first printing was banned by the Japanese censors. It was translated into Esperanto as Danco de skeletoj in 1927. The playwright Koreya Senda did not write about the violence explicitly, but adopted the pen name "Koreya" after he was mistaken for a Korean by the mob. In 1986, a Japanese playwright, Fukuchi Kazuyoshi (福地一義), discovered his father's diary, read the account of the massacre which is contained in it and wrote a play which is based on his father's account. The play was briefly revived in 2017.

In 2014, nonfiction writer Katō Naoki documented the massacre in his book September on the Streets of Tokyo (Kugatsu, Tōkyō no rojō de 九月、東京の路上で). This book has also been translated into Esperanto. As of 2020, Katō continues to advocate on behalf of victims' families and fight against historical revisionism.

In the Pachinko Novel and Drama, a young Hansu escapes Yokohama with his father's former Yakuza employer, Ryoichi from the Great Kantō Earthquake and avoids getting caught by a group of Japanese vigilantes burning a barn of Koreans escaping the massacre in Kantō with the help of a Japanese farmer.

See also 
 Gando massacre
 Human rights in Japan
 Jinan incident
 List of massacres in Japan
 Nanjing Massacre
 Racism in Japan

References 

Massacres in Japan
Mass murder in 1923
1923 Great Kantō earthquake
September 1923 events
Anti-Korean sentiment in Japan
Anti-Korean violence
Massacres in 1923
Pogroms
Massacres committed by Japan